Ghost Forest is an art installation by Maya Lin in Madison Square Park in New York City. The piece is composed of 49 dead Atlantic white cedars.

The installation ran from May 10, 2021, to November 14, 2021.

The trees, after the installation had finished, were saw-milled into planks on November 19, 2021, and donated to Rocking the Boat, an educational non-profit in the Bronx, to be built into boats by students. A trustee for Rocking the Boat experienced the installation and inquired about using the trees after it was over. The Madison Square Park Conservancy and Lin agreed, with Lin saying:  The boats are planned to be finished and launched for the first time in mid-2023.

References

2021 sculptures
Installation art works
Public art in New York City
Environmental art

External links